is the eighth Japanese single by South Korean girl group Kara. It was released on March 27, 2013.

Editions
The single was released in four different editions. All limited editions come with a trading card randomly selected from five kinds.

 CD+DVD Type A: This edition includes the standard track list and a DVD including the music video of the song, a dance version and the making of.
 CD+DVD Type B: This edition includes the standard track list and a DVD featuring the music video of the song "Orion", which was released as the B-side of their previous single "Electric Boy" and later included in their third Japanese album Girls Forever (2012), a close-up version and its making of.
 First Press Limited CD Only: This edition includes a bonus track, "Beautiful Night", which was used as the opening theme song for the group's anime KARA the Animation.
 Regular CD Only: This edition contains the standard track list only.

Composition
The song was written and composed by Simon Isogai, who also composed "Winter Magic", "Ima, Okuritai 'Arigatō'" and "Orion", released by the group, with arrangements by ArmySlick.

The B-side "My Boy" is a Japanese version of the song "Date (My Boy)", released on the group's third Korean album Step. It was written and composed by Kim Won-hyun, and translated in Japanese by Kaori Moriwaka.

"Beautiful Night" is a bonus track of the first press regular edition. It is a Korean song written and composed by Kim Won-hyun. It was used as opening theme song for their anime KARA the Animation.

Music video
A teaser for the music video of "Bye Bye Happy Days!" was released on March 13, 2013 through Kara's official Japanese YouTube page. The full music video was released two days later on the TV channel Space Shower TV Plus.

Track listing

Chart performance 
The physical single debuted at the position number three on Oricons daily chart, selling 25,552 copies in its first day. On the next day, the single climbed to the position number two, selling 12,880 copies. On the third day, the single remained to the position number two, selling 9,265 copies. On the fourth and fifth days the single sold 7,729 and 6,217 copies respectively. With the total of 61,643 copies sold within the first 5 days, the single surpassed the first week sales of "Electric Boy", which sold 57,942 copies in its first week.

Oricon chart

Billboard charts

References

External links

2013 singles
Japanese-language songs
Kara (South Korean group) songs
Dance-pop songs
2013 songs